The Louisville Assembly Plant is an automobile manufacturing plant owned by Ford Motor Company in Louisville, Kentucky. The  plant on 180 acres opened in 1955 and currently employs a total of 4,554 people. It is located adjacent to the Louisville International Airport on the south side of the city. Ford also operates another plant in Louisville, Kentucky Truck Assembly.

History
Ford Motor Company began manufacturing Model T cars in Louisville in 1913, at 931 South Third Street. A new four story assembly plant at Third & Eastern Parkway opened in 1916. In 1925 Ford moved production to a new, one level assembly plant on Southwestern Parkway, on the Ohio River. The current plant on Fern Valley Road opened in 1955. Most Edsel automobiles (around 67%) were produced here in 1957-1959. Other models produced included Sunliners, Fairlanes & Galaxies. Louisville Assembly also produced heavy trucks as well as full-size cars on a separate assembly line. Heavy truck production ceased when the Kentucky Truck Plant opened on Chamberlain Lane in 1969. The factory continued with passenger car production that was augmented in 1973 with the addition of F-Series light trucks. F-Series/LTD passenger car production continued until 1981 when the plant was shut down for retooling for the new compact pickup, the Ranger, and its SUV cousin, the Bronco II. Production began in January 1982. Ford produced its two millionth Ranger/Bronco II at the plant on April 26, 1988. On February 14, 1990, Ford began producing the Explorer SUV in Louisville after investing $563 million at the plant. It produced one million Explorers as of August 27, 1993. Production of the similar Mercury Mountaineer began in April 1996, and Ranger production gave way in April 1999 to the Ford Explorer Sport Trac.

Production of the Explorer and Mountaineer ended in December 2010. The Explorer moved to Ford's Chicago Assembly plant, and the Mountaineer was discontinued with the demise of the Mercury brand. On April 4, 2012, Louisville Assembly began producing the Ford Escape, which was previously housed at Kansas City Assembly, and on August 25, 2014, the Lincoln MKC.  In 2019, production of the new Lincoln Corsair (MKC replacement) began.

Products made

Current (model years)
Ford Escape (2013–Present)
Lincoln Corsair (2020–Present)

Past (model years)
Ford LTD (1967-1981)
Ford F-Series (1973-1982)
Ford Ranger (1983-1999)
Ford Bronco II (1984-1990)
Ford Explorer (1991-2010)
Mazda Navajo (1991-1994)
Mercury Mountaineer (1997-2010)
Ford Explorer Sport Trac (2001-2010)
Lincoln MKC (2015–2019)

See also
 List of major employers in Louisville, Kentucky

References

Ford factories
Motor vehicle assembly plants in Kentucky
Economy of Louisville, Kentucky
Buildings and structures in Louisville, Kentucky